Kathmandu National School is named for Kathmandu, the capital of Nepal. Originally named Sishu Niketan School, it is located in Old Baneshour, Kathmandu. The school was founded in 1980.

Schools in Kathmandu